Jamia Tawakkulia Renga, or simply Renga Madrasah, is a madrasah located in the village of Renga, near Mogla Bazar, in South Surma Upazila, about  south of Sylhet, Bangladesh, along the Sylhet to Moulvibazar Highway. It was founded in 1919 by Maulana Arkan Ali; later run by his son Khalifa Madani Shaikhut Tafsir Hazrat Maulana Bodrul Alom Sheikh e Renga. The rector is Maulana Shamsul Islam Khalil Ibn Sheikh e Renga. The present principal is Maulana Muhiul Islam Burhan Ibn Sheikh e Renga.

Education levels
The Jamia offers primary, secondary, higher secondary, undergraduate, and postgraduate Islamic education.

Students and staff
As of 2015, there are 42 staff (academic and administrative combined) and enrollment is roughly 1350.

References

Dakshin Surma Upazila
Qawmi madrasas of Bangladesh
Deobandi Islamic universities and colleges
1919 establishments in India